Izabella Maizza Chiappini (born 28 September 1995) is a Brazilian-born Italian water polo player.

She was part of the Brazilian team at the 2013 World Aquatics Championships, 2015 World Aquatics Championships, and the 2016 Summer Olympics.

After that, Chiappini chose to represent Italy internationally.

See also
 Brazil at the 2015 World Aquatics Championships

References

External links

Brazilian female water polo players
Living people
Place of birth missing (living people)
1995 births
Olympic water polo players of Brazil
Water polo players at the 2016 Summer Olympics
Pan American Games medalists in water polo
Pan American Games bronze medalists for Brazil
Water polo players at the 2015 Pan American Games
Medalists at the 2015 Pan American Games